Lagu may refer to: 
 Balungan,  Lagu, Indonesian gamelan musical ensemble's term for melody 
 Laghu language, a.k.a. Lagu language, a near-extinct language once spoken in parts of the Solomon Islands
 Lagu (rune) (ᛚ), a rune of the Anglo-Saxon fuþorc
 Lennox Lagu
 The Indonesian and Malay name of song